William Fulbourn (died c. 1441), of Fulbourn St. Vigors, Cambridgeshire, was an English politician.

Family
Fulbourn may have been the illegitimate son of William Fulbourn and Alice Whiting of Fulbourn. William married before 1396.

Career
He was a Member (MP) of the Parliament of England for Cambridgeshire in December 1421.

References

Year of birth missing
1441 deaths
English MPs December 1421
People from Fulbourn